Natali is a feminine given name. People with the name include:

Given name
 Little Natali (born 1988), Cypriot singer
 Natali Castillo (born 1992), Argentine singer
 Natali Dizdar (born 1984), Croatian pop singer
 Natali Germanotta (born 1992), American fashion designer and stylist
 Natali Morris (born 1978), American businesspeople
 Natali Pronina (born 1987), Azerbaijani swimmer
 Natali Shaheen (born 1994), Palestinian football player

See also
Natali, disambiguation page
Natali (surname), list of people with the surname

Feminine given names